Structural Equation Modeling is a peer-reviewed scientific journal publishing methodological and applied papers on structural equation modeling, a blend of multivariate statistical methods from factor analysis to systems of regression equations, with applications across a broad spectrum of social sciences as well as biology. One of the founders and the current editor-in-chief of the journal is George Marcoulides (University of California, Riverside).

According to Journal Citation Reports, the journal has a 2021 impact factor of 6.181.

References

External links 
 

Statistics journals
Quarterly journals
Taylor & Francis academic journals
Publications established in 1994
English-language journals